Regner E. "Ray" Suárez (born October 26, 1946) is the former alderman of the 31st Ward of the City of Chicago; he was first elected in 1991. He was unsuccessful in the April 2015 election, and left office May 2015.

In November 2015, he was appointed to a position on the Illinois International Port District Authority.

Personal life
Suárez was born in Yauco, Puerto Rico, and later enlisted in the United States Marine Corps. He is a Vietnam Veteran. He and his wife, Marta, live in the Cragin neighborhood.

Early career
Suárez held various city jobs before becoming alderman. He worked for Streets and Sanitation, in the mayor's office as an Administrative Assistant working with Development Action Grants, and Assistant Commissioner of Department of Street and Sanitation.

In 1989, he was appointed to the Illinois Job Training Coordinating Council, where he advised the governor how to spend the budget for job-training.

Aldermanic career
Suárez was elected alderman in 1991. He was subsequently reelected in 1995, 1999, 2003, 2007, and 2011. He lost reelection in 2015 to Milly Santiago.

He was the chairman of Housing and Real Estate, and sits on seven other committees: Aviation, Budget and Government Operations, Buildings, Finance, Transportation and the Public Way, and Zoning.

The alderman has proposed that private businesses such as bars be required to install police surveillance cameras on their premises. "If you're not doing anything wrong, what do you have to worry about?" he demanded, in response to privacy concerns.

From May 2011 until May 2015, Suarez was also Chicago's Vice Mayor.

References

External links

Suarez's City of Chicago website

1946 births
American politicians of Puerto Rican descent
Hispanic and Latino American politicians
Living people
People from Yauco, Puerto Rico
Chicago City Council members
Puerto Rican United States Marines
United States Marines
Puerto Rican people in Illinois politics